Dilkoon is a locality between the towns of Casino and Grafton on the Summerland Way in northern New South Wales, Australia. The North Coast railway passes through, and a railway station was provided between 1907 and 1973.

References

Towns in New South Wales
Northern Rivers